Earth, Wind & Fire is the debut studio album by American band Earth, Wind & Fire, released in February 1971 by Warner Bros. Records. The album got to No. 24 on the Billboard Top Soul Albums chart and was certified Gold in France by the SNEP.

Overview
The album was produced by Joe Wissert. Hip hop artist Ludacris has also named this LP as one of his five favorite records which he considers forerunners of hip-hop.

Singles
The track "Love Is Life" reached No. 43 on the Billboard Hot Soul Songs chart.

Samples
"Moment of Truth" was sampled by LL Cool J on the track "Murdergram", Kid N Play on the track "Energy" and The Jungle Brothers on "Good News Comin' and What You Waiting For". "Bad Tune" was sampled by Brand Nubian on "Dance to My Ministry", Diamond D on "Feel the Vibe", DJ Shadow on "In/Flux" and by Lupe Fiasco on "Carrerra Lu". "Fan the Fire" was also sampled by Michie Mee on "Jamaican Funk".

Critical reception 

Lester Bangs of Rolling Stone noted a "heavy Sly influence" and the "smooth harmonies" of The Fifth Dimension on the LP. The Village Voices Robert Christgau was ambivalent towards the album's various musical "cross-references", including "the expert vocal harmonies [that] neither fit the concept nor assert any personality of their own", and said that even its successful songs have "a way of slipping away unnoticed once the record is over".
John Bush of AllMusic gave the album four-and-a-half out of five stars and complimented the song's' "freewheeling arrangements". Bush found "the songwriting was as strong and focused as the musicianship" and praised the LP's social context, noting "unerringly positive compositions, reflecting the influence of the civil rights movement with nearly every song urging love, community, and knowledge as alternatives to the increasing hopelessness plaguing American society". Billboard noted "soul oriented rhythms and harmonies" on the album with songs which encourages one "to move on the dance floor". Bob Talbert of the Detroit Free Press also wrote "I'm not sure what to call this group. Afro-gospel-jazz-blues-rock? Must there be a label?".

Isaac Hayes called Earth, Wind & Fire one of the band's five essential recordings.

Track listing

Personnel

Musicians
Michael Beal – guitars
Leslie Drayton – trumpet
Wade Flemons – electric piano, vocals
Sherry Scott – vocals
Alexander Thomas – trombone
Chet Washington – reeds
Maurice White – percussion, drums, vocals, electric kalimba
Verdine White – bass
Don Whitehead – acoustic piano, electric piano, vocals
Doug Carn – Hammond organ
Phillard Williams – percussion, conga

Production
Producer: Joe Wissert
Recording engineer: Bruce Botnick
Arranger: Earth, Wind & Fire
Horn arrangements: Leslie Drayton
Art direction: Ed Thrasher
Design: Mary Ann Dibs
Artwork: Russ Smith

Charts
Album

Certifications

References 

1971 debut albums
Earth, Wind & Fire albums
Albums produced by Joe Wissert
Albums recorded at Sunset Sound Recorders
Warner Records albums
Psychedelic soul albums